This is the complete list of Asian Games medalists in water polo from 1951 to 2018.

Men

Women

References

 Medalists from previous Asian Games – Men
 Medalists from previous Asian Games – Women

External links
Olympic Council of Asia

Asian Games
Water polo
medalists